Fotis Papadopoulos (born 1 July 1954) is a retired Greek footballer.

Career

Statistics

References

External links
 

1954 births
Living people
Footballers from Kilkis
Greek footballers
Greek expatriate footballers
Bundesliga players
VfL Bochum II players
VfL Bochum players
Kalamata F.C. players
Place of birth missing (living people)
Association football defenders
Association football midfielders